Marco Argüelles (born March 3, 1989, in Puebla City, Puebla) is a former Mexican professional footballer.

External links

1989 births
Living people
People from Puebla (city)
Association football midfielders
Mexican footballers
La Piedad footballers
Leones Negros UdeG footballers
Tecos F.C. footballers
Mineros de Zacatecas players
Lobos BUAP footballers
Cafetaleros de Chiapas footballers
Dorados de Sinaloa footballers
Club Atlético Zacatepec players
Ascenso MX players